Union (Horse with Two Discs) is a bronze sculpture by Christopher Le Brun, made in 1999–2000 in an edition of three large casts. It depicts a horse standing square on four legs, flanked on either side by a large disc. The sculpture measures . One cast has been displayed on the highwalk at London Wall, beside the entrance to the Museum of London, since 2005. The third and final cast is displayed at the New Art Centre, at Roche Court in Wiltshire.

References
 Christopher Le Brun PRA, New Art Centre
 Installations, Christopher Le Brun 
 London Public Art: Union – Horse with Two Discs, Ian Visits
 Museum of London, London Wall EC2, Ornamental Passions
 Christopher Le Brun: The Distance, Friedman Benda

Bronze sculptures in the United Kingdom
Outdoor sculptures in London
Horses in art
2000 sculptures